Oromandibular dystonia is a form of focal dystonia affecting the mouth, jaw and tongue, and in this disease it is hard to speak. It is associated with bruxism.

Botulinum toxin has been used in treatment.

Since the root of the problem is neurological, doctors have explored sensorimotor retraining activities to enable the brain to "rewire" itself and eliminate dystonic movements. The work of several doctors such as Nancy Byl and Joaquin Farias has shown that sensorimotor retraining activities and proprioceptive stimulation can induce neuroplasticity, making it possible for patients to recover substantial function that was lost due to cervical dystonia, oromandibular dystonia and dysphonia.

References

Extrapyramidal and movement disorders